Thomas Francis Qualters (born April 1, 1935), nicknamed Money Bags, is a former right-handed major league baseball pitcher, born in McKeesport, Pennsylvania. He played with the Philadelphia Phillies and the Chicago White Sox in the 1950s.

He made his major league debut on September 13, 1953. He had an unusual rookie year, as he posted an ERA of 162.00. In his only appearance that year, he allowed six earned runs and retired just one batter. However, he remained on the Phillies' roster for two years (1953 and 1954), only appearing in that one game, and earning the nickname "Money Bags" from his teammates. After spending two years in the International League, he had a couple more cups of coffee with Philadelphia (pitching in six games in 1957 and one in 1958) before being sent to the Chicago White Sox. He pitched respectably for the Sox in 1958, but did not record a win, loss or save. His final major league game was September 25, 1958. Qualters continued to pitch in the minors, mainly at the Triple-A level, through the end of 1962.

In total, Qualters appeared in 34 games without a major-league decision. He is the only pitcher to appear on a Topps baseball card four times without ever recording a win or loss.

After his baseball career ended, Qualters worked for the Pennsylvania Fish and Boat Commission as a law enforcement officer. 

Now retired and living in Somerset, Pennsylvania, he is married to Beverly Qualters and has 8 grandchildren and 18 great-grandchildren.  He spends time with his family and helps out with the Somerset High School baseball team.

References

External links

1935 births
Living people
Baseball players from Pennsylvania
Chicago White Sox players
Dallas Rangers players
Houston Buffs players
Indianapolis Indians players
Major League Baseball pitchers
Miami Marlins (IL) players
Philadelphia Phillies players
Reidsville Phillies players
San Diego Padres (minor league) players
Sportspeople from McKeesport, Pennsylvania
Williamsport Grays players